The Cașin is a right tributary of the river Râul Negru in Romania. It discharges into the Râul Negru in Catalina. It flows through the villages and towns Plăieșii de Sus, Plăieșii de Jos, Iacobeni, Valea Seacă, Sânzieni, Târgu Secuiesc and Catalina.

Tributaries

The following rivers are tributaries to the river Cașin (from source to mouth):

Left: Borviz, Cetatea
Right: Carpen, Pârâul Primejdios, Bella, Pârâul Adânc, Valea Seacă, Cetatea de Piatră, Pârâul Văii, Turia

References

Rivers of Romania
Rivers of Harghita County
Rivers of Covasna County